Mehtab Singh, Sardar Bahadur (1879–1938) was a lawyer, freedom fighter and legislator who became closely associated with Gurudwara Reform movement and later became the president of the Shiromani Gurdwara Prabandhak Committee.

Early life and education
Mehtab Singh born on 1879 at Shahpur District now in Pakistan. His father Hazur Singh died when Mehtab Singh was four years old. He had his early education at village school and passed the Entrance examination for Central Model School, Lahore, in 1895.

Then he proceeded to England where he studied Law. He returned to British India in 1898 as Barrister at Law. He was appointed government pleader at Ferozpur and then transferred to Lahore. He was honoured by the Government with the titles of Sardar Sahib in 1915 and Sardar Bahadur in 1918.

Freedom Struggle
In 1921 he became the member of Punjab Legislative Council and then became its vice president but he resigned from both vice presidentship and membership of the Council on 11 November 1921, as a protest against British Government for taking away the keys of Harimandir Sahib treasury and he plunged into the Gurdwara Reform Movement.

On 26 November 1921, was arrested at Ajnala in an Akali Diwan on the charge of making a seditious speech and sentenced to 6 months imprisonment, with a fine of Rs. 1000. In the absence of Baba Kharak Singh in jail, Mehtab Singh acted as President of Shiromani Gurdwara Prabandhak Committee. He was again arrested in the Gurdwara Guru ka Bagh agitation in 1922. In October 1923 when SGPC and SAD were declared unlawful organisations, he again with other leaders detained. He was one of the Seven delegates of All Parties Conference at Delhi on 24 February 1928.

At All Parties Convention at Calcutta on 28 and 29 December 1928, he strongly opposed the views of Mohammed Ali Jinnah. He was the president of the committee for the notified Sikh Gurdwaras at Nankana Sahib from 1933 to 1936.

Mehtab Singh died of Heart attack on 23 May 1938.

References

1879 births
1938 deaths
Sikh politics
Sardar Bahadurs